Unn Thorvaldsen (born 6 February 1943) is a Norwegian javelin thrower. She was born in Haslum in Bærum. She competed at the 1960 Summer Olympics in Rome.

References

External links

1943 births
Living people
Sportspeople from Bærum
Norwegian female javelin throwers
Olympic athletes of Norway
Athletes (track and field) at the 1960 Summer Olympics